Luffa acutangula is a cucurbitaceous vine that is commercially grown for its unripe fruits as a vegetable. Mature fruits are used as natural cleaning sponges. Its fruit slightly resembles a cucumber or zucchini with ridges. It ranges from central and eastern Asia to southeastern Asia. It is also grown as a houseplant in places with colder climates. English common names include angled luffa, Chinese okra, dish cloth gourd, ridged gourd, sponge gourd, vegetable gourd, strainer vine, ribbed loofah,  silky gourd, silk gourd, and sinkwa towelsponge.

Uses
The young fruit of some Luffa cultivars are used as cooked vegetables or pickled or eaten raw, and the shoots and flowers are sometimes also used. Like Luffa aegyptiaca, the mature fruits are harvested when dry and processed to remove all but the fruit fibre, which can then be used as a sponge or as fibre for making hats.

Gallery

See also
 Luffa aegyptiaca
 Okra

References

Asian vegetables
Cucurbitoideae
Fruit vegetables
Flora of the Indian subcontinent